Table Mountain is a  peak in the southern section of the Wicklow Mountains range in Ireland.  With a prominence of only , it is only listed in a few of the recognised categories of mountains in Ireland; it is the 110th–highest peak on the Vandeleur-Lynam Irish scale.  Table Mountain is at the apex of a horseshoe-shaped "boggy" massif with its larger neighbours, Camenabologue  and Conavalla  that sit at the head of the Glenmalure valley; all three peaks lie close to the "central spine" of the range as it runs from Kippure in the north, to Lugnaquillia in the south.  There is no recorded Irish language name for Table Mountain, and it has no connection with Table Mountain in Cape Town, South Africa.


Bibliography

See also
Wicklow Way
Wicklow Mountains
Lists of mountains in Ireland
List of mountains of the British Isles by height
List of Hewitt mountains in England, Wales and Ireland

References

External links
MountainViews: The Irish Mountain Website, Table Mountain
MountainViews: Irish Online Mountain Database
The Database of British and Irish Hills , the largest database of British Isles mountains ("DoBIH")
Hill Bagging UK & Ireland, the searchable interface for the DoBIH

Mountains and hills of County Wicklow
Mountains under 1000 metres